King Aweida (1850–1921) was a King and Head Chief of Nauru.

Place in history

Aweida was born Aweijeda in Boe.

Before Nauru came under European rule, it was governed by a king who made laws that were enforced by local chiefs. When Germany annexed Nauru to German New Guinea, Aweida retained his sovereignty as king and remained the chieftain of the Nauruan people, he may have reigned from about 1888 to 1921 although very little else is known  about him.
Aweijeda was born to Chief Jim and his wife, Eidingab of the Emea tribe. His first marriage was to a chieftain's daughter, Eibinua of the Eamwit tribe from Bush village. They had several children. After Eibinua died, Aweijeda remarried, this time to Eidukiri, also of the Eamwit tribe, but they had no children.

See also 
Eigamoiya

References 

1850 births
1921 deaths
Nauruan royalty
Head Chiefs of Nauru
People from Boe District
19th-century monarchs in Oceania
19th-century Nauruan people